Annabel Rose Langbein  (born 1958) is a New Zealand celebrity cook, food writer and publisher. She has published 25 cookbooks and fronted three seasons of her TV series, Annabel Langbein The Free Range Cook, which launched on the TV One network in New Zealand and has since screened in more than 90 countries.

Early life, family and education
Langbein was born in Mangakino and grew up in Wellington. She was the youngest of two daughters of Fred and Anne Langbein. Her father worked as an engineer but was a keen vegetable gardener and beekeeper, while her mother was a cook and home science university graduate. She credits her mother as the inspiration for her love of cooking.

Langbein has described herself as being a hippie as a teenager. She left home at age 16 to live for several years with her then-boyfriend and their friends in a run-down house by the Whanganui River, without electricity or running water. They were self-reliant and lived off their hunting, fishing and a half-hectare vegetable garden, and her cooking skills were honed by experimentation. She subsequently moved to Gisborne where she worked as a possum trapper and met her future husband, Ted Hewetson. At age 22, she moved overseas and went backpacking in South America, running her own bar in Brazil for awhile, before returning to New Zealand when she was 25. Langbein and Hewetson married in 1991. They have two children, Sean and Rose, and have homes in Auckland and Wanaka.

She has never formally trained as a chef, but obtained a Diploma of Horticulture with Distinction from Lincoln University in 1981, and attended residential cooking courses at the Culinary Institute of America in upstate New York.

Career
Since 1984, Langbein has worked as a food writer, writing for several magazines including The New Zealand Heralds Canvas magazine, NZ Life & Leisure, NZ Listener and Cuisine, as well as writing and publishing her own cookbooks. She has appeared on The Today Show in the US, Saturday Kitchen in the UK, 24Kitchen in The Netherlands and numerous other media outlets

Books
Langbein self-published her first book of recipes 1988, and has since built one of New Zealand's most successful publishing houses, Annabel Langbein Media. She has authored and self-published 25 cookbooks, which have been published in numerous languages and sold more than two million copies all around the world. The Best of Annabel Langbein: Great Food for Busy Lives, was published in 1997, has been reprinted numerous times since and is known as "the kitchen bible" in many New Zealand households. Her 2010 book The Free Range Cook was available in more than 70 countries and sold more than 110,000 copies.

In 1991 she established the Culinary Institute of New Zealand, a specialist food marketing consultancy, and was responsible for marketing and media campaigns for New Zealand food manufacturers, retailers and exporters, as well as promoting New Zealand food offshore for Trade New Zealand. For seven years she was a director of New Zealand gourmet cheese company Kapiti and for three years she was a judge for the International Association of Culinary Professionals' Julia Child Award for the best first cookbook.

Her philanthropic work has included raising substantial sums for the National Heart Foundation of New Zealand, the Life Education Trust, and other charity groups.

Television
UK-based global content company FremantleMedia first noticed Langbein's presenting skills in 2008, when she posted on YouTube a series of how-to cooking features that she had made to promote her book Eat Fresh. They approached her and offered to back her to produce a fully fledged TV series.

In August 2010, New Zealand's TV One debuted her show, Annabel Langbein The Free Range Cook, a 13-part cooking and lifestyle series filmed at Langbein's cabin on the shores of Lake Wanaka and showcasing New Zealand's scenery and artisanal produce. She co-produced the series and worked with a seven-person TVNZ crew over a six-month filming schedule. It was the first time she had fronted her own cooking show and series on television, but she has since co-produced two further seasons of the show.

The series has been distributed worldwide by FremantleMedia, and has appeared on the ABC and SBS networks in Australia and other networks in France, The Netherlands, Belgium, Sweden, Poland, Israel, UK, Canada, Asia, Brazil and Japan. In Brazil the show airs on the GNT cable channel under the translated title A Cozinha Caseira de Annabel (Annabel's Homemade Cooking).

Honours
Langbein's books and TV series have won numerous national and international awards. In February 2016 she won the People's Choice Award for Best Home Chef in a TV Series at the US-based Taste Awards.

Her books have won Gourmand World Cookbook Awards for Best Entertaining Cookbook, Best Easy Recipes Cookbook and Best Celebrity Cookbook. In 2013 she won NZ Guild of Food Writers Culinary Quills for best website, best TV series and best book, and in 2014 she won Best Culinary Series and Best Presenter at the Best on the Box People's Choice Awards. The Best of Annabel Langbein: Great Food for Busy Lives won the 1999 New Zealand Guild of Foodwriters Recipe Book of the Year award, while Savour the Pacific: A Discovery of Taste won the Best Photography in the World award at the World Cookbook Awards in Périgueux, France, as well as a Ladle at the 2001 World Food Media Awards.

In 2008, Langbein was inducted into the Wellington Girls' College Business Hall of Fame, and in 2013 she received New Zealand's most prestigious individual achievement award, a World Class New Zealand Award. Langbein was awarded an honorary Doctor of Commerce degree by Lincoln University in 2017.

In the 2018 Queen's Birthday Honours, Langbein was appointed an Officer of the New Zealand Order of Merit, for services as a food writer.

Bibliography
Annabel Langbein's Cookbook: Featuring Recipes from the New Zealand Listener (1988)
Smart Food for Busy People: Stylish Food for New Zealanders (1993)
More Taste Than Time: Fast Track Food for Busy People (1994)
With Fork & Spoon: Easy Imaginative Food for Time-Hungry People (1996)
The Best of Annabel Langbein: Great Food for Busy Lives (1999)
Savour the Pacific: A Discovery of Taste (2000)
Savour Italy: A Discovery of Taste (2001)
Cooking to Impress Without Stress (2003)
Assemble: Sensational Food Made Easy (2005)
Desserts: New Healthy Kitchen – Colorful Recipes for Health and Well-Being (2006)
Grilling: New Healthy Kitchen – Colorful Recipes for Health and Well-Being (2007)
Eat Fresh: Cooking Through the Seasons (2007)
Celebrate: A Calendar of Cakes for Special Dates (2008)
Anyone Can Cook: Fresh Ideas for Busy Lives (2009)
Anyone Can Bake: Home Baked Treats Made Easy (2010)
Annabel Langbein The Free Range Cook (2010)
Annabel Langbein Free Range in the City (2011)
Annabel Langbein The Free Range Cook: Simple Pleasures (2012)
Annabel Langbein A Free Range Life (2013)
Annabel Langbein The Free Range Cook: Through the Seasons (2014)
Annabel Langbein Winter Goodness (2015)
Annabel Langbein Endless Summer (2015)
Annabel Langbein Share the Love (2016)
Annabel Langbein Celebrate Summer! (2016)
Annabel Langbein Cheap Thrills (2017)
ESSENTIAL Volume 1: Best-Ever Meals for Busy Lives (2017)
ESSENTIAL Volume 2: Sweet Treats for Every Occasion (2017)
Bella: My Life in Food (2020)

References

External links
Official website
Langbein's Facebook
Langbein's Instagram
Langbein's Pinterest
Langbein's YouTube

Living people
Food Network chefs
New Zealand television chefs
New Zealand food writers
People educated at Wellington Girls' College
Lincoln University (New Zealand) alumni
Women chefs
Women food writers
New Zealand columnists
Women cookbook writers
20th-century New Zealand women writers
21st-century New Zealand women writers
20th-century New Zealand writers
21st-century New Zealand writers
Officers of the New Zealand Order of Merit
New Zealand women columnists
1958 births